Crubeen is a townland in central Ireland that consists of about 600 acres.

See also
 List of townlands of County Laois

References

External links
 Google Maps satellite image of Crubeen

Townlands of County Laois